Nana Aba Appiah Amfo (born 30 September 1971) is a Ghanaian linguist, university administrator and the current Vice-chancellor at the University of Ghana. Until her appointment, she was the Pro Vice-Chancellor for Academics and Students Affairs at the University of Ghana in West Africa.

Early life and education 
Born in Kumasi, Nana Aba Appiah Amfo had her early education at University Primary School (KNUST Basic School), Services Primary School at Takoradi and Goldfields School Complex in Tarkwa. Amfo attended Holy Child School for her O’ Level education and later attended Archbishop Porter Girls’ Secondary School for her A’ Level. She proceeded to the University of Ghana for a Bachelor's degree in French and Linguistics. She completed the Norwegian University of Science and Technology in Trondheim, Norway in 2001 with an MPhil degree in Linguistics and acquired a PhD degree in 2007 from the same university in Linguistics.

Career 
Amfo began her career as a lecturer at the Department of Linguistics at the University of Ghana in 2001. After leaving to pursue further studies in Norway, she returned to Ghana and continued lecturing at the University of Ghana. She was promoted to the rank of Senior Lecturer in 2007, the same year she obtained her PhD. She became an associate professor in 2011, and Professor in 2017. She was elected  an executive committee member of Fédération Internationale des Langues et Littératures Modernes. Nana Aba Amfo served as the Pro Vice-Chancellor for Academic and Student Affairs at the University of Ghana from November 2019 to July 2021. In July 2021, she was appointed as the Acting Vice Chancellor. She received professional management training from the University of Applied Sciences, Germany, INSEAD and Harvard Business School. She has served as the Chairperson of the Department of Linguistics (2013–14) and the Dean of the School of Languages. Amfo serves on the advisory board of Coalition of People Against Sexual and Gender-Based Violence and Harmful Practices (CoPASH) under the auspices of the UNFPA.

Memberships and fellowships 

 Member, Society of Communication, Medicine and Ethics
 International Pragmatics Association (first African to be a Consultation Board member in Association's history)
 West African Linguistics Society
 Linguistics Association of Ghana (President, 2010–2014)
 Foundation Fellow, African Humanities Program of the American Council of Learned Societies
 Fellow, German Academic Exchange Service (DAAD)
 Commonwealth Professional.

Research 
Amfo's research interests has been mainly about  linguistic sub-discipline of Pragmatics.

Personal life
Together with her husband, Frank Amfo, they have three children, Yoofi, Maame Araba and Efua Benyiwa.

References 

1971 births
Living people
University of Ghana alumni
Vice-Chancellors of universities in Ghana
Ghanaian women academics
Women academic administrators
Norwegian University of Science and Technology alumni
Alumni of Holy Child High School, Ghana
Archbishop Porter Girls' Senior High School alumni
Fante people